The 1968–69 Greek Football Cup was the 27th edition of the Greek Football Cup. The competition culminated with the Greek Cup Final, held at Karaiskakis Stadium, on 9 July 1969. The match was contested by Panathinaikos and Olympiacos, with Panathinaikos winning on the toss of a coin, because of the final result (1–1).

Calendar
From the last qualifying round onwards:

Last qualifying round

|}

*Coin toss.

• The last 16 of previous season's Cup qualified for the 2nd round.

Knockout phase
In the knockout phase, teams play against each other over a single match. If the match ends up as a draw, extra time will be played. If a winner doesn't occur after the extra time the winner emerges by a flip of a coin.The mechanism of the draws for each round is as follows:
In the draw for the round of 32, the teams that had qualified to previous' season Round of 16 are seeded and the clubs that passed the qualification round are unseeded.

In the draws for the round of 16 onwards, there are no seedings, and teams from the same group can be drawn against each other.

Bracket

Round of 32

|}

Round of 16

|}

Quarter-finals

|}

Semi-finals

|}

Final

The 25th Greek Cup Final was played at the Karaiskakis Stadium.

According to regulation, if the match was drawn and extra time failed to separate the two sides, the winner would be determined by the toss of a coin. Mimis Domazos, captain of Panathinaikos, chose correctly and his team was awarded the cup.

|}

Reference

External links
Greek Cup 1968-69 at RSSSF

Greek Football Cup seasons
Greek Cup
Cup